Idastrandia is a genus of jumping spiders endemic to Singapore. Its only described species is Idastrandia orientalis.

Kálmán Szombathy described a single male in 1915, which is about five millimeters long. There are drawings in the original description, and the male pedipalp and unusual serrate cheliceral tooth has been drawn by Proszynski in 1983. It has still not been attached to any of the current salticid groups.

Name
The genus is probably named after a relative of first describer Embrik Strand.

Footnotes

References
  (2000): An Introduction to the Spiders of South East Asia. Malaysian Nature Society, Kuala Lumpur.
  (2007): The world spider catalog, version 8.0. American Museum of Natural History.

Further reading
  (1915): Attides nouveaux appartenant aux collections du Musee national hongrois. Ann. hist.-nat. Mus. nat. Hung. 13: 474-475.
  (1983): Redescriptions of types of Oriental and Australian Salticidae (Aranea) in the Hungarian Natural History Museum, Budapest. Folia ent. hung. 44: 283-297.

External links
 Diagnostic drawings

Salticidae
Monotypic Salticidae genera
Taxa named by Embrik Strand
Endemic fauna of Singapore
Spiders of Asia